Dame Caroline Jan MacEwen , known as Carrie MacEwen, is a British ophthalmology consultant who has served as the chair of the General Medical Council (GMC) since May 2022. She was previously acting chair of the GMC between August 2021 and May 2022, the chair of the Academy of Medical Royal Colleges between 2017 and 2020 and the president of the Royal College of Ophthalmologists (RCOphth) between 2014 and 2017.

Career
MacEwen studied medicine at the University of Dundee, graduating in 1981. She specialised in ophthalmology and has been a consultant since 1996. She works as a consultant at the Ninewells Hospital, NHS Tayside in Dundee and is an Honorary Professor of Ophthalmology at the University of Dundee School of Medicine. Her research is focused on paediatric ophthalmology, ocular trauma, sports ophthalmology and disorders of eye movement. MacEwen is also the chair of the Healthcare Quality Improvement Partnership, ophthalmology specialty adviser to the Chief Medical Officer for Scotland, co-clinical lead for the ophthalmology workstream of the Getting It Right First Time programme in England, and Associate Dean for less than full time training for East Scotland.

While president of the RCOphth, she helped to develop the Ophthalmic Common Clinical Competency Framework and commissioned The Way Forward, an initiative to help develop service redesign.

MacEwen served as acting chair of the GMC between August 2021 and May 2022 before being appointed as the chair by the Privy Council. She is the second woman to hold the position since its founding in 1858. In a speech at the Royal College of Physicians and Surgeons of Glasgow in October 2021, she set out the GMC's vision on how they would help to improve doctors' wellbeing with a shift from "stepping in when things go wrong to fostering supportive environments that stop harm from happening in the first place". MacEwen said that the GMC would do this by conducting more research and data collection and further development of their equality, diversity, and inclusion programme. She would also aim to reduce disproportionality between BME and white doctors in fitness-to-practice referrals by employers and attainment in undergraduate and postgraduate education. MacEwen oversaw the consultation on the review of Good Medical Practice, the main guidance document for UK doctors' standards, in 2022.

Honours 
Fellow of:
 British and Irish Orthoptic Society (Honorary)
 College of Optometrists (Honorary)
 Faculty of Medical Leadership and Management (Senior Fellow)
 Faculty of Public Health (Honorary)
 Faculty of Sport and Exercise Medicine UK (Honorary)
 Royal College of General Practitioners (Honorary)
 Royal College of Ophthalmologists (Honorary/Past President)
 Royal College of Pathologists (Honorary)
 Royal College of Physicians of Edinburgh
 Royal College of Physicians and Surgeons of Glasgow (Honorary)
 Royal Society of Edinburgh
 Worshipful Company of Barbers (Honorary Freeman)

She was appointed Dame Commander of the Order of the British Empire (DBE) in the 2021 Birthday Honours for services to ophthalmology and healthcare leadership during the Covid-19 pandemic.

References

External links 
 Profile page: Dr. Carrie MacEwen, The Royal College of Ophthalmologists

Living people
Academics of the University of Dundee
British ophthalmologists
Fellows of the Royal College of Surgeons
Fellows of the Royal College of Ophthalmologists
Women ophthalmologists
Dames Commander of the Order of the British Empire
1958 births
Fellows of the Royal Society of Edinburgh